The Dynasts is an English-language closet drama in verse and prose by Thomas Hardy. Hardy himself described this work as "an epic-drama of the war with Napoleon, in three parts, nineteen acts and one hundred and thirty scenes". Not counting the Forescene and the Afterscene, the exact total number of scenes is 131. The verse is primarily iambic pentameter, occasionally tetrameter, and often with rhymes. The three parts were published in 1904, 1906 and 1908.

Because of the ambition and scale of the work, Hardy acknowledged that The Dynasts was not a work that could be conventionally staged in the theatre, and described the work as "the longest English drama in existence". Scholars have noted that Hardy remembered war stories of the veterans of the Napoleonic wars in his youth, and used them as partial inspiration for writing The Dynasts many years later in his own old age. In addition, Hardy was a distant relative of Captain Thomas Hardy, who had served with Admiral Horatio Nelson at Trafalgar. Hardy consulted a number of histories and also visited Waterloo, Belgium, as part of his research.

George Orwell wrote that Hardy had "set free his genius" by writing this drama and thought its main appeal was "in the grandiose and rather evil vision of armies marching and counter-marching through the mists, and men dying by hundreds of thousands in the Russian snows, and all for absolutely nothing."

Synopsis
In addition to the various historical figures, The Dynasts also contains an extensive tragic chorus of metaphysical figures ("Spirits" and "Ancient Spirits") who observe and discuss the events.

Part First contains a Forescene and six Acts with 35 Scenes. The time period of the events in Part First covers 10-months, from March 1805, the time when Napoleon repeated his coronation ceremony at Milan and took up the crown of Lombardy, through January 1806, the time of the death of William Pitt the Younger. The principal historical events entail Napoleon's invasion plans for England, which are abandoned when French Admiral Pierre-Charles Villeneuve sails for the south, the Battle of Trafalgar, and subsequently the Battle of Ulm and the Battle of Austerlitz. The division of the Acts and its Scenes is as follows:

Fore Scene.  The Overworld

Act First:
 Scene I.  England – A Ridge in Wessex
 Scene II.  Paris – Office of the Minister of Marine
 Scene III.  London – The Old House of Commons
 Scene IV.  The Harbour of Boulogne
 Scene V.  London – The House of a Lady of Quality
 Scene VI. Milan.  The Cathedral

Act Second:
 Scene I.  The Dockyard, Gibraltar
 Scene II.  Off Ferrol
 Scene III.  The Camp and Harbour of Boulogne
 Scene IV. South Wessex – A Ridge-like Down near the Coast
 Scene V.  The Same – Rainbarrows' Beacon, Egdon Heath

Act Third:
 Scene I.  The Chateau at Pont-de-Briques
 Scene II.  The Frontiers of Upper Austria and Bavaria
 Scene III.  Boulogne – The St Omer Road

Act Fourth:—
 Scene I.  King George's Watering-place, South Wessex
 Scene II.  Before the City of Ulm
 Scene III.  Ulm – Within the City
 Scene IV.  Before Ulm – The Same Day
 Scene V.  The Same – The Michaelsberg
 Scene VI.  London – Spring Gardens

Act Fifth:
 Scene I.  Off Cape Trafalgar
 Scene II.  The Same – The Quarter-deck of the "Victory"
 Scene III.  The Same – On Board the "Bucentaure"
 Scene IV.  The Same – The Cockpit of the "Victory"
 Scene V.  London – The Guildhall
 Scene VI.  An Inn at Rennes
 Scene VII. King George's Watering-place, South Wessex

Act Sixth:
 Scene I.  The Field of Austerlitz – The French Position
 Scene II.  The Same – The Russian Position
 Scene III.  The Same – The French Position
 Scene IV.  The Same – The Russian Position
 Scene V.  The Same – Near the Windmill of Paleny
 Scene VI.  Shockerwick House, near Bath
 Scene VII.  Paris – A Street leading to the Tuileries
 Scene VIII.  Putney – Bowling Green House

Part Second contains six Acts with 43 Scenes.  The time period of the events of Part Second ranges over 7 years, from 1806 to just before the French invasion of Russia in 1812. The listing of the Acts and Scenes is as follows:

Act First:
 Scene I.  London – Fox's Lodgings, Arlington Street
 Scene II.  The Route between London and Paris
 Scene III.  The Streets of Berlin
 Scene IV.  The Field of Jena
 Scene V.  Berlin – A Room overlooking a Public Place
 Scene VI.  The Same
 Scene VII.  Tilsit and the River Niemen
 Scene VIII.  The Same

Act Second:
 Scene I.  The Pyrenees and Valleys adjoining
 Scene II.  Aranjuez, near Madrid – A Room in the Palace of Godoy, the "Prince of Peace"
 Scene III.  London – The Marchioness of Salisbury's
 Scene IV.  Madrid and its Environs
 Scene V.  The Open Sea between the English Coasts and the Spanish Peninsula
 Scene VI.  St Cloud – The Boudoir of Josephine
 Scene VII.  Vimiero

Act Third:
 Scene I.  Spain – A Road near Astorga
 Scene II.  The Same
 Scene III. Before Coruna
 Scene IV.  Coruna – Near the Ramparts
 Scene V.  Vienna – A Cafe in the Stephans-Platz

Act Fourth:
 Scene I.  A Road out of Vienna
 Scene II.  The Island of Lobau, with Wagram beyond
 Scene III.  The Field of Wagram
 Scene IV.  The Field of Talavera
 Scene V.  The Same
 Scene VI.  Brighton – The Royal Pavilion
 Scene VII.  The Same
 Scene VIII.  Walcheren

Act Fifth:
 Scene I.  Paris – A Ballroom in the House of Cambaceres
 Scene II.  Paris – The Tuileries
 Scene III.  Vienna – A Private Apartment in the Imperial Palace
 Scene IV.  London – A Club in St. James's Street
 Scene V.  The old West Highway out of Vienna
 Scene VI.  Courcelles
 Scene VII.  Petersburg – The Palace of the Empress-Mother
 Scene VIII.  Paris – The Grand Gallery of the Louvre and the Salon-Carre adjoining

Act Sixth:
 Scene I.  The Lines of Torres Vedras
 Scene II.  The Same – Outside the Lines
 Scene III.  Paris – The Tuileries
 Scene IV.  Spain – Albuera
 Scene V.  Windsor Castle – A Room in the King's Apartments
 Scene VI.  London – Carlton House and the Streets adjoining
 Scene VII.  The Same – The Interior of Carlton House

Part Third contains seven Acts with 53 Scenes, and an After Scene.  The historical time period of Part Third covers Napoleon's invasion of Russia in 1812 through his defeat at the Battle of Waterloo in 1815. The division of the Acts and Scenes is as follows:

Act First:
 Scene I.  The Banks of the Niemen, near Kowno
 Scene II.  The Ford of Santa Marta, Salamanca
 Scene III.  The Field of Salamanca
 Scene IV.  The Field of Borodino
 Scene V.  The Same
 Scene VI.  Moscow
 Scene VII.  The Same – Outside the City
 Scene VIII.  The Same – The Interior of the Kremlin
 Scene IX.  The Road from Smolensko into Lithuania
 Scene X.  The Bridge of the Beresina
 Scene XI.  The Open Country between Smorgoni and Wilna
 Scene XII.  Paris – The Tuileries

Act Second:
 Scene I.  The Plain of Vitoria
 Scene II.  The Same, from the Puebla Heights
 Scene III.  The Same – The Road from the Town
 Scene IV.  A Fete at Vauxhall Gardens

Act Third:
 Scene I.  Leipzig – Napoleon's Quarters in the Reudnitz Suburb
 Scene II.  The Same – The City and the Battlefield
 Scene III.  The Same – from the Tower of the Pleissenburg
 Scene IV.  The Same – At the Thonberg Windmill
 Scene V.  The Same – A Street near the Ranstadt Gate
 Scene VI.  The Pyrenees – Near the River Nivelle

Act Fourth:
 Scene I.  The Upper Rhine
 Scene II.  Paris – The Tuileries
 Scene III.  The Same – The Apartments of the Empress
 Scene IV.  Fontainebleau – A Room in the Palace
 Scene V.  Bayonne – The British Camp
 Scene VI.  A Highway in the Outskirts of Avignon
 Scene VII.  Malmaison – The Empress Josephine's Bedchamber
 Scene VIII. London – The Opera-House

Act Fifth:
 Scene I.  Elba – The Quay, Porto Ferrajo
 Scene II.  Vienna – The Imperial Palace
 Scene III.  La Mure, near Grenoble
 Scene IV.  Schonbrunn
 Scene V.  London – The Old House of Commons
 Scene VI.  Wessex – Durnover Green, Casterbridge

Act Sixth:
 Scene I.  The Belgian Frontier
 Scene II.  A Ballroom in Brussels
 Scene III.  Charleroi – Napoleon's Quarters
 Scene IV.  A Chamber overlooking a Main Street in Brussels
 Scene V.  The Field of Ligny
 Scene VI.  The Field of Quatre-Bras
 Scene VII.  Brussels – The Place Royale
 Scene VIII.  The Road to Waterloo

Act Seventh:
 Scene I.  The Field of Waterloo
 Scene II.  The Same – The French Position
 Scene III.  Saint Lambert's Chapel Hill
 Scene IV.  The Field of Waterloo – The English Position
 Scene V.  The Same – The Women's Camp near Mont Saint-Jean
 Scene VI.  The Same – The French Position
 Scene VII.  The Same – The English Position
 Scene VIII.  The Same – Later
 Scene IX.  The Wood of Bossu

After Scene.  The Overworld

Analysis
The design of The Dynasts is extremely ambitious, and because of its coverage of historical events of the same era, has received comparison to Tolstoy's War and Peace. Emma Clifford has written that Hardy used Tolstoy's novel as one of many sources of inspiration for the work, and in fact owned an early translation. However, it was not necessarily as a primary source, as Hardy also drew on the History of Europe by Archibald Alison, among others.

Hardy juxtaposes scenes of ordinary life with scenes involving the principal historical figures of the age, and concentrating on their desire to found dynasties to preserve their power. There are extensive descriptions of landscape and battle scenes that are characterised by shifts of visual perspective that, in the opinion of John Wain, anticipate cinematic techniques. George Witter Sherman has postulated on Hardy's observations of life in London as influences on elements of The Dynasts. Elna Sherman has discussed Hardy's references to music and songs in the work. Anna Henchman has written about Hardy's use of imagery in the manner of astronomical observation at great distances from the earth in this work. Lawrence Jones has analysed Hardy's idiosyncrasies in his manner of narrative in The Dynasts. J.O. Bailey has postulated an analogy of the Spirits in The Dynasts with other Mephistopheles-like figures in literature, and in relation to the Book of Job.

References

External links

 Poetry Foundation page on Thomas Hardy

Plays by Thomas Hardy
1904 plays
1906 plays
1908 plays
Works about the Napoleonic Wars
Closet drama